Out Cold is a 2001 American comedy film directed by the music video sibling directing team The Malloys (Brendan and Emmett Malloy). Starring Jason London, Willie Garson and Lee Majors, the film is about a group of snowboarders in Alaska. It presents itself as a parody of 1990s "ski school" films and makes a number of references to the film Casablanca. A number of elements of the latter, including plot and famous lines, were incorporated into the film.

The film is the Malloys' feature film directorial debut. Not counting the surfing documentary Thicker than Water (2000), directed and starring musician Jack Johnson with directing duties shared with the brother's cousin Chris and Emmett Malloy (Brendan was not involved with that film).

Plot 
Rick Rambis, best friend Luke, and other friends Anthony, "Pig Pen", Jenny, Lance and Stumpy, all live and work at a ski resort on Bull Mountain in Alaska. The mountain and resort were founded by Herbert "Papa" Muntz who loved to drink and ski at the same time until he died doing so. His son, Ted, took over the mountain and plans to sell it to wealthy Colorado ski resort tycoon, John Majors. In addition to being friends, Rick has romantic designs on Jenny, but is held back as he is still getting over his ex, Anna, who mysteriously disappeared after 3 weeks of summer love in Mexico.

After arriving at the mountain, John Majors plans to change the mountain name and turn the ski village into a first class resort but seeks Rick's help in getting his rowdy friends in line so as not to scare off his investors. John brings with him to the mountain his daughters, Inga, a Swiss ski bunny, and Anna, Rick's summer fling. After Anna's arrival, Rick then gets drunk and misses his date with Jenny. Later, Anna explains she left Rick in Mexico because she was already engaged and that Rick was the other man. Majors begins to make major changes to the town and mountain, such as changing the dive bar to an upscale club and removing the statue of Papa Muntz from the center of the town. Majors offers Rick a contract to be his new manager and Rick agrees on the condition that his friends all get to stay, but Majors secretly has Ted fire them behind his back. Rick finds out about the firing of his friends and quits his job and races to stop his friends from leaving.

Rick gives an inspirational speech about how the mountain is their home and not letting Majors ruin the memory of Papa Muntz, they all grab their snowboards and head for the mountain. The group of friends and Inga then cause bedlam at the festivities and Major is outraged at Rick's betrayal. Rick frees Anna from her father and takes her to an airstrip where Barry, her fiancé, waits in his plane. He tells Anna what they had in Mexico was special but that he realized she belongs with Barry and Rick watches Anna fly away. The friends defeat Majors and Ted decides he is no longer selling the mountain. Rick asks Jenny out again after revealing he no longer thinks of Anna.

Cast

Soundtrack 
The Out Cold soundtrack is a 12-track compilation of songs from the film. It is available on the RCA record label.  The Weezer song "Island in the Sun" plays an important part in the film, but is left off of the soundtrack.

Reception 
Out Cold has an 8% approval rating on Rotten Tomatoes, a review aggregator, based on 49 reviews; the average rating is 2.9/10.  The site's consensus reads: "A party movie that substitutes surfs for snow, Out Cold will leave viewers just that with its gross-out humor and sophomoric plot."  Metacritic rated it 22/100 based on 15 reviews. These reviews are not unanimously bad.

References

External links 
 
 
 
 

2001 films
2001 comedy films
American comedy films
American skiing films
Snowboarding films
Spyglass Entertainment films
Touchstone Pictures films
Films scored by Michael Andrews
Films set in Alaska
Films shot in British Columbia
2001 directorial debut films
2000s English-language films
Films about beer
2000s American films
Films shot in Alaska
Films directed by The Malloys